Qaleh-ye Shohadad (also Romanized as Qal‘eh-ye Shohadāɖ; also known as Qal‘eh-ye Shohadā) is a village in Dodangeh-ye Sofla Rural District, Ziaabad District, Takestan County, Qazvin Province, Iran. At the 2006 census, its population was 154 and included 48 families.

References 

Populated places in Takestan County